William McCreery may refer to:

William McCreery (Maryland politician), U.S. Representative from Maryland
William McCreery (Pennsylvania politician), U.S. Representative from Pennsylvania
William B. McCreery, former mayor of the City of Flint, Michigan State Treasurer and diplomat
William C. McCreery (1896–1988), American lawyer and member of the New York State Assembly